Dai pai dong is a kind of traditional food stall in Hong Kong. It was famous and popular in Hong Kong during the 1960s and 1970s. The literal meaning of dai pai dong in English is “Big license stall”. The characteristics of Dai Pai Dong are lack of air-conditioners, unclean environment but various kinds of food. However, starting from 1980s, the government stopped issuing new licenses and began buying them back. Due to its hygienic problem and the deaths of the license holders, dai pai dong closed down and was replaced by different kinds of restaurant.  There are only 25 dai pai dong left in Hong Kong, according to the Food and Environmental Hygiene Department, which manages the licenses. Nevertheless, because of voices about preserving local food culture, it is suggested that licenses should be issued again to the vendors and the dai pai dong owners. Besides, there are several changes of dai pai dong due to the urban development.

Background 
Dai Pai Dong was popular among the working class due to its cheap price in the 1950s and it earned the nickname “poor people’s nightclub”. 

However, the rise of hygiene and traffic congestion complaints forced the government to stop issuing “big licenses” in 1956 and limited their transfer due to black market of selling licenses. The licensees could only transfer the licenses to their spouses upon their death, not even their children. If the licensees did not have a spouse, the license would expire.

In 1975, with the opening of the first cooked food center, a lot of dai pai dong moved into these center and markets for easy control. In 1983, the government began to buy back licenses from the holders to improve public hygiene. Since the licenses could not be transferred, many aged license holders chose to sell their licenses to the government. The number of dai pai dong in Hong Kong dropped significantly. There were 68 dai pai dong in Kowloon City. But now there is none. Now, there are only 25 dai pai dong remaining in Hong Kong: 11 in Sham Shui Po, 10 in Central, three in Wan Chai and one in Tai O. Only a few of them are still on the streets in the traditional style. 

Nevertheless, while the traditional food stalls, which represent Hong Kong local food culture, closed down one by one because of urban development, there are voices suggesting preserving dai pai dong. 

At the same time, it is to preserve Hong Kong people collective memories.

Controversy 
In 2005, the closing down of several local food stalls like Man Yuen Noodles has raised voices of preserving local food culture, including dai pai dong.  About preserving dai pai dong, there are both agreeing and disagreeing.

Support

Food and Health Bureau 

Preserving dai pai dongs and vendors helps Hong Kong to promote tourism, protect local culture, create job opportunities as well as alleviate poverty. Should the government finalises the decision of preserving local food culture, the Bureau will coordinate with the government.

Hong Kong citizens

Not only do dai pai dongs represent Hong Kong traditional food culture, but also people's collective memory. The relationships between customers and stalls’ owners are close and friendly. dai pai dong is one of the places connecting them.

Dai Pai Dongs owners 

Dai Pai Dongs represent Hong Kong food culture. They wished that the government can set standards for them to improve, instead of forcing them to move out. They want to preserve local food culture and the collective memories of Hong Kong people.

Opposition

Sham Shui Po District Council 

The District Council disagrees because Dai Pai Dongs have hygiene and safety problems, they also block the roads and streets. Moreover, the attitudes of the owners of Dai Pai Dongs are not aggressive in preserving the Dai Pai Dongs.

Some of the Legislative Councillor

Some members of the Hong Kong Legislative Council have voiced concerns that Dai Pai Dongs may lead to noise and safety problems, which may negatively affect the images of a district and the lives of residents nearby.

Tourism Board 

It is said that the existence of Dai Pai Dongs blocks the roads. There are also hygiene problems. The boards did not want the tourists to feel that Hong Kong was not a clean place.

Changes 

Though preserving Dai Pai Dongs is a controversial issue, the Hong Kong Tourism Board argues that there are policies to help the Dai Pai Dongs. Besides, some of them are operating in a different ways. These changes in Dai Pai Dongs help them to survive in Hong Kong. Local food culture can also	be	protected.

Policies 

To response the voices in the society, the Hong Kong government loosened the control on licenses transfer. 9 Dai Pai Dong licenses on the Hong Kong island were transferred and the stalls are kept alive.
To coordinate the improvement in quality of Dai Pai Dongs, the Food and Environmental Hygiene Department has provided funds to Dai Pai Dongs in Central. The funds were to improve the sewage disposal systems and gas systems. There were regular	sanitation events to maintain cleanliness.

Operating indoor 

A typical Dai Pai Dong is a big iron box painted green with foldable tables and chairs on the roadside during opening hours with no air-conditioning. However, because of management issues, some Dai Pai Dongs have moved to Municipal Services Building. For instance, Dai Pai Dongs in Tai Kwok Tsui.

Further reading 
 Lai, Lawrence Wai-chung (2003). Town Planning in Hong Kong: A Review of Planning Appeal Decisions, 1997–2001. Hong Kong: Hong Kong University Press; London: Eurospan. .

References

External links 
  香港獨立媒體(2015年3月1日), 【小販自強系列】陳朝鏗：誰說熟食小販不衛生？
  香港獨立媒體(2015年3月1日),【小販自強系列】小販成就社區復興運動
  HKSAR Government, 23-11-2005 立法會：「大牌檔文化承傳政策」動議辯論發言全文
  蘋果日報(2015年3月11日),【消費星期三】碩果僅存大排檔 屹立中環半世紀

Cantonese words and phrases
Hong Kong cuisine
Restaurants by type